The 2012 Southern Thailand bombings were a series of bombings that took place in Yala, Yala Province and in Hat Yai, Songkhla Province, on 31 March 2012.

Attacks

Yala
The first attack involved a truck bomb that ripped through a busy shopping district in Yala. About 20 minutes later, a second bomb planted in a motorcycle exploded as rescuers convened at the site of the original bombing. Later, a third explosion from a device placed in a car set fire to nearby buildings. About 11 people were killed and 110 wounded by the blasts, with the second explosion causing a majority of casualties.

Hat Yai 
Following the bombings in Songkhla, an explosion in the basement Lee Gardens Plaza Hotel damaged that building and an adjacent McDonald's in Hat Yai, killing at least four and leaving 416 wounded, mainly from smoke inhalation. It was first reported to be the cause of a gas leak but later was attributed to a car bomb. The bombing was regarded by some sources as an escalation in the insurgency because its target was a hotel popular with tourists from Malaysia and Singapore.

Suspects 
The attacks have been regarded by most major news outlets as part of the broader South Thailand insurgency. While no terrorist organisation took responsibility for the bombings, the most likely culprit is the Gerakan Mujahidin Islam Patani (GMIP) separatist movement, which is a splinter group of the Gerakan Mujahidin Pattani.

According to security sources, Sahudin Tohjehmae was suspected to carry out the three bomb attacks with the help of Saifulloh Sahfru, a terrorist suspect who is a friend of Faisol Hayisama-ae, who was suspected of carrying out the bomb attack at Hat Yai International Airport in 2005.

References

See also 
 South Thailand insurgency

South Thailand insurgency
Terrorist incidents in Thailand in 2012
Songkhla province
Yala province
Car and truck bombings in Asia
Improvised explosive device bombings in Thailand
Islamic terrorism in Thailand
Religiously motivated violence in Thailand
Mass murder in 2012
2012 crimes in Thailand